The Selene Stakes is a Thoroughbred horse race run annually at Woodbine Racetrack in Toronto, Ontario, Canada. Held during the third week of May, the Grade III event is open to three-year-old fillies.  Raced over a distance of  miles on Polytrack synthetic dirt, it currently offers a current purse of $122,145.

Inaugurated in 1954 as a six furlong sprint race,  it was run at a distance of seven furlongs from 1965 through 1975 after which it was modified to its current distance of  miles (8.5 furlongs).

The race was run in two divisions in 1962, 1964, 1972, 1979, 1983, and 1989.

Records
Speed  record:
 1:43.63 - Coffee Clique (2013) (Stakes and track record)

Most wins by a jockey:
 5 - Sandy Hawley (1972, 1974, 1978, 1988, 1989)
 5 - Patrick Husbands (2001, 2012, 2018, 2021, 2022)

Most wins by a trainer:
 8 - Mark E. Casse (2001, 2012, 2015, 2018, 2019, 2020, 2021, 2022) 

Most wins by an owner:
 4 - Conn Smythe (1957, 1959, 1964, 1979)

Winners

*  † In the second division of the 1962 race, Vase finished first but was disqualified and set back to fifth.

See also
 List of Canadian flat horse races

References
 The Selene Stakes at Pedigree Query

Graded stakes races in Canada
Flat horse races for three-year-old fillies
Recurring sporting events established in 1954
Woodbine Racetrack
Sport in Toronto